"Royal Guards March" is the march of the King's Guard of Thailand. The music was originally composed by King Bhumibol Adulyadej in 1948 called "Ratchawanlop". The lyrics were later composed by Major General Sipho Thasanut (ศรีโพธิ์ ทศนุต) and were edited by Phra Chenduriyang. Bhumibol gave the lyricised song the name "March Ratchawanlop" in 1952.

Lyrics 
Thai lyrics
เราทหารราชวัลลภรักษาองค์
พระมหากษัตริย์สูงส่ง
ล้วนแต่องอาจแข็งแรง
เราทุกคนบูชากล้าหาญ
วินัยเทิดเกียรติชาติไว้ทุกแห่ง
ใจดุจเหล็กเพชรแข็งแกร่งมิกลัวใคร

เราเป็นกองทหารประวัติการณ์ก่อเกิด
กำเนิดกองทัพบกชาติไทย
เราทุกคนภูมิใจ
ได้รับไว้วางพระราชหฤทัย
พิทักษ์สมเด็จเจ้าไทย
ตลอดในพระวงศ์จักรีฯ

เราทหารราชวัลลภรักษาองค์ฯ
จะถวายสัตย์ซื่อตรง
องค์ราชาราชินี
ถ้าแม้นมีภัยพาลอวดหาญ  มิเกรง ดูหมิ่น ข่มเหง ย่ำยี
เราจะถวายชีวี มิหวาดหวั่น
จะลุยเลือดสู้ตายจะเอากายป้องกัน

เป็นเกราะทองรบประจัญศัตรู
ฝากฝีมือปรากฏ
เกียรติยศฟุ้งเฟื่อง
กระเดื่องกองทัพบกไทย
ไว้นามเชิดชูราชวัลลภคู่ปฐพี

English translation
We the Royal Guards 
Noble king
All brave and strong
We all worship courage
Discipline honors the nation everywhere
Heart like diamond, strong and unafraid of anyone

We are a regiment of historic birth
Born the Royal Thai Army
We are all proud
Received in his heart
Defend the Royalty of Thailand
Throughout the Chakri dynasty

We the King's Guards 
Dedicate our loyalty to
The King and the Queen 
Should there be danger, presumptious, insulting, oppressive, derogative
We will give life without fear
Will wade through the blood and fight to death

A golden armor to fight enemies
Show our abilities
Prosperous honor
Known throughout the Royal Thai Army
Let the name of the Royal Guards carve into the Earth

References

External links 
 มาร์ชราชวัลลภ ฉบับบรรเลง
 มาร์ชราชวัลลภ บรรเลงโดยวงดุริยางค์ทหารบก
 มาร์ชราชวัลลภ บรรเลงโดยฟลุต
 มาร์ชราชวัลลภ บรรเลงโดยเปียโน
 มาร์ชราชวัลลภ บรรเลงโดยวงออเครสตร้า จากการแสดงแสงสีเสียง We love King ณ พระที่นั่งอนันตสมาคม.
 มาร์ชราชวัลลภ บรรเลงโดยวงออเครสตร้า จากวงดนตรีของมหาวิทยาลัยแห่งรัฐเท็กซัสตอนเหนือ

1948 compositions
Compositions by Bhumibol Adulyadej
Thai military marches